Patrick Oeuvrard (born 31 May 1945) is a French sailor who competed in the 1976 Summer Olympics.

References

1945 births
Living people
French male sailors (sport)
Olympic sailors of France
Sailors at the 1976 Summer Olympics – Soling
Place of birth missing (living people)